Huntstown is a ghost town in Putnam County, in the U.S. state of Ohio.

History
Huntstown was platted in 1883. A post office was established at Huntstown in 1879, and remained in operation until 1896.

References

Geography of Putnam County, Ohio